The following lists events that happened during 1906 in Chile.

Incumbents
President of Chile: Germán Riesco (until September 18), Pedro Montt

Events 
25 June – Chilean presidential election, 1906
16 August – 1906 Valparaíso earthquake
4 September – The Order of Merit (Chile) is created.

Births
date unknown – Juan Zanelli (d. 1944)
10 October – Olga Maturana (d. 1973)
20 October – Arturo Torres Carrasco (d. 1987)

References 

 
Years of the 20th century in Chile
Chile